Barbu Catargiu (26 October 1807 – ) was a conservative Romanian politician and journalist. He was the first Prime Minister of Romania, in 1862, until he was assassinated on 20 June that year. He was a staunch defender of the great estates of the boyars, and notably originated the conservative doctrine that "feudalism in Romania had never existed".

Early life
Barbu Catargiu was born on 26 October 1807 to Ștefan Catargiu, a political activist and Țița (Stanca) Văcărescu. He lived abroad in Paris from 1825 to 1834, where he studied law, history, and philosophy. He returned to Wallachia for a short time, and was a member of the Obsteasca Assembly of Wallachia. An opponent of violence and armed revolution, he resumed his world travels during the Revolutions of 1848, working primarily as a journalist and making a documentary.

Political life
After his return to Romania, Catargiu entered political life as a firm conservative. He believed that evolution, rather than violent revolution was the best way to modernize the Government, and would give the fledgling Romania the best chance at unity. He also advocated an aristocratic republic as the best form of governance, clearly believing in guarding the power of the boyars.

Catargiu was appointed to the position of minister of finances by Alexandru Ioan Cuza. He quickly gained acclaim for his oratorical skills, and became the focal point of the Conservative Party. He did very little to actually organize the party, instead depending on his own charisma and ideals to give the party focus. Cuza, despite not agreeing with the conservative doctrine and even seeing Catargiu as an adversary of sorts, recognized his abilities and the power of his followers and chose Catargiu as prime minister of the newly formed union between Wallachia and Moldavia.

On 15 February 1862, Catargiu was sworn in as the first prime minister of Romania, ruling from Bucharest. As prime minister, Catargiu hoped to reorganize and simplify the administration. He formed four administrative divisions, two in what had been Wallachia and two in Moldavia. He placed the four divisions under the supervision of a minister of the interior, and unified the financial and judicial departments under the central government. Arguably the most important act of his rule was his order to begin a railroad in Moldavia that would link the two provinces and greatly aided unification. He also continued his support for the "old order" and claimed that large estates were historically sanctioned and were solely the property of the boyars. He also clamped down on rioting in the cities, censored the press, and refused to allow large assemblies to meet. He denied the right of the people to meet on the Bucharest "Field of Liberty" to commemorate the Revolution of 1848, an act which garnered him much animosity.

Assassination
One week after the "Field of Liberty" Incident, on 20 June 1862, Catargiu was shot and killed at close range when leaving a parliamentary meeting. The assassin was never apprehended, despite the efforts of the police force. The killing left the Conservative Party without a strong leader or sense of direction. They quickly lost power, as Catargiu was replaced by Nicolae Crețulescu, a much more progressive politician.

Despite Catargiu's relative unpopularity, his memory was celebrated by the Romanians. A statue of him was placed opposite the Bibescu Vodă Park in Bucharest, near the Metropolitan Tower, close to where he was killed. It stood from 1900 until 1984; in 2001, it was restored, albeit without the original pedestal.

1862 Cabinet
During his premiership Catargiu's cabinet consisted of:

Constantin N. Brăiloiu/Dimitrie Cornea (Justice)
Alexandru Moruzi/Grigore Balș/Alexandru Catargi/Theodor Ghica (Finance)
Ion Ghica (War)
Apostol Arsache (Foreign Affairs)
Barbu Catargiu/Dimitrie Cornea/Alexandru Florescu (Public Works)
Barbu Catargiu/Apostol Arsache (Interior)
Grigore Balș/Barbu Bellu (Religion and Public Instruction)
Apostol Arsache/Alexandru Florescu (Control)

See also
List of unsolved murders

References

Further reading
Hitchins, Keith. 1996. The Romanians 1774–1866. Oxford: Clarendon Press.
Barbara Jelavich. 1984. Russia and the Formation of the Romanian National State 1821–1878. Cambridge: Cambridge University Press.
Riker, T.W. 1971. The Making of Roumania. New York: Arno Press & The New York Times.
Robert William Seton-Watson. 1963. Hamden, Conn: Archon Books.
Maria Todorova. 2004. New York: NYU Press.

External links
Romanian Language Biography
Romanian List of Notable Assassination Attempts

1807 births
1862 deaths
Assassinated heads of government
Assassinated Romanian politicians
Conservative Party (Romania, 1880–1918) politicians
Deaths by firearm in Romania
Male murder victims
People murdered in Romania
Politicians from Bucharest
Prime Ministers of Romania
Prime Ministers of the Principality of Wallachia
Romanian Ministers of Interior
Unsolved murders in Romania